Craig Reynolds (born June 15, 1996) is an American football running back for the Detroit Lions of the National Football League (NFL). He played college football at Kutztown, and signed with the Washington Redskins as an undrafted free agent following the 2019 NFL Draft.

College career
Reynolds was a member of the Kutztown Golden Bears for five seasons, redshirting as a true freshman. As a redshirt sophomore, he was named first-team All-Pennsylvania State Athletic Conference (PSAC) East after leading the conference with 1,189 rushing yards and 14 touchdowns. Reynolds rushed 109 times for 456 yards and four touchdowns, had 29 receptions for 410 yards and five touchdowns and returned four kickoffs  for 108 yards and nine punts for 153 yards and one touchdown before suffering a season-ending injury eight games into the season and was again named first-team All-PSAC East. As a redshirt senior, he was named first-team All-PSAC East for a third straight season after rushing for 823 yards and 15 touchdowns on 172 carries and catching 40 passes for 472 yards and three touchdowns while also completing a seven-yard pass for another touchdown and gaining 380 return yards. Reynolds finished his collegiate career as the schools third all-time leading rusher with 2,650 yards and second in school history with 5,277 all-purpose yards.

Professional career

Washington Redskins

Reynolds signed with the Washington Redskins as an undrafted free agent after participating in a rookie mini camp with the team on May 13, 2019. He was waived during final roster cuts at the end of training camp, but resigned to the team's practice squad the following day on September 1, 2019. Reynolds was promoted to the Redskins active roster on October 19, 2019 and made his NFL debut the following day against the San Francisco 49ers, playing on special teams. On November 5, 2019, Reynolds was waived by the Redskins.

Atlanta Falcons
On November 12, 2019, Reynolds was signed to the Atlanta Falcons practice squad. On December 30, 2019, Reynolds was signed to a reserve/future contract.

On August 7, 2020, Reynolds was waived by the Falcons, but re-signed on August 27. He was waived on September 5, 2020.

Jacksonville Jaguars
On September 14, 2020, Reynolds was signed to the Jacksonville Jaguars practice squad, and was released a week later. On November 21, 2020, Reynolds was re-signed to the practice squad. He was signed to the active roster on November 28. Reynolds was waived on December 5, 2020, and re-signed to the practice squad three days later. He was elevated to the active roster on December 26 for the team's week 16 game against the Chicago Bears, and reverted to the practice squad after the game. He signed a reserve/future contract on January 4, 2021. He was waived on March 17, 2021.

Detroit Lions
On August 12, 2021, Reynolds signed with the Detroit Lions. He was waived on August 31, 2021 and re-signed to the practice squad the next day. Reynolds was elevated to the Lions' active roster before the team's Week 14 game against the Denver Broncos after running backs D'Andre Swift and Jamaal Williams were ruled out for the game. He gained 83 yards on 11 carries in a 10-38 loss. Reynolds was elevated again the following week and made his first career start in a 30-12 win over the Arizona Cardinals, rushing for 112 yards on 26 carries. The Lions signed Reynolds to their active roster on December 20, 2021, on a contract through the 2022 season.

Reynolds made the Lions final roster in 2022 as the third running back on the depth chart. He was placed on injured reserve on November 9, 2022. He was activated on December 17.

On March 13, 2023, Reynolds re-signed with the Lions.

Personal life 
Reynolds' older brother Eric was a high school football standout and potential NFL prospect, but became addicted to drugs and has been in prison since Craig was in seventh grade. Craig calls Eric before every game.

References

External links
 Kutztown Golden Bears bio
 Washington Redskins bio

1996 births
Living people
American football running backs
Atlanta Falcons players
Detroit Lions players
Jacksonville Jaguars players
Kutztown Golden Bears football players
Players of American football from Pennsylvania
Sportspeople from Montgomery County, Pennsylvania
Washington Redskins players